Sam Forse Collins (June 9, 1928 – November 3, 2021) was an American politician. He served as a Democratic member in the Texas House of Representatives from 1959 to 1964.

Life and career
Collins was born in New Orleans, Louisiana, the son of Sam Cody Collins and Onie Lelee Forse. He grew up in Newton, Texas. Following his graduation from Newton High School, Collins attended Stephen F. Austin State University and Baylor University, graduating from the latter. He was married to Doris Shofner (died 1955) and Sue Johnson.

Besides his position in the Texas House of Representatives, Collins worked for the Sabine River Authority for 35 years, where he served as a general manager, and was a local sports announcer and historian.

Collins died November 3, 2021, in Newton, Texas.

References

1928 births
2021 deaths
Democratic Party members of the Texas House of Representatives
Politicians from New Orleans